The Wound Man is a surgical diagram which first appeared in European medical manuscripts of the fourteenth and fifteenth centuries. The illustration acted as an annotated table of contents to guide the reader through various injuries and diseases whose related cures could be found on the text's nearby pages. The image first appeared in a printed book in 1491 when it was included in the Venetian Fasciculus medicinae, likely Europe's first printed medical miscellany. Thereafter it circulated widely in printed books until well into the seventeenth century. The Wound Man has since become a recognisable figure in popular culture.

Description
The Wound Man illustrates various injuries that a person might receive through war, accident, or disease: cuts and bruises from multiple weapons, rashes and pustules, thorn scratches, and the bites of venomous animals. The figure also includes some schematic anatomical outlines of several organs within his unusual, transparent abdomen.  

In earlier manuscript versions, the figure is surrounded by numbers and phrases which indicate where in the accompanying treatise a healer might find a particular helpful procedure. For instance, in a German Wound Man now in the Wellcome Library, London (MS 49), the spider crawling up the man's thigh is labelled "Wo eine spynne gesticht, 20" ("When a spider bites, 20"), directing the reader to paragraph 20 of the book for an appropriate cure. Similarly, written along the large spear piercing the figure's left side and penetrating into his stomach is the legend "So der gross viscus wund wirt, 14" ("If the large intestine is injured, 14"). Turning to the corresponding cure number 14, the reader finds:

Despite these injuries, however, the Wound Man is still depicted as standing defiantly alive. This reaffirms the fact that the figure was not intended as a threatening one: instead it explained and glorified the cures and medical treatments available in the texts that he accompanied.

In popular culture
The Wound Man continues to be referenced in popular culture: 

In the 1980 novel Red Dragon by Thomas Harris, it is mentioned that Will Graham was tipped off to the fact that Hannibal Lecter was a serial killer from this diagram, as Lecter killed his sixth victim in this manner. A further reference to the diagram is made by the character Clarice Starling in the sequel novel Hannibal. 
The Wound Man is also referenced in season 1, episode 6 of NBC's Hannibal TV series in 2013, and again visually and by name in season 2, episode 7 of the same show.

The Royal College of Emergency Medicine uses a Wound Man as a supporter in its heraldic achievement.

The Wound Man from von Gersdorff's 1519 treatise is used as the cover of The Practical by Stone Franks.

The Wound Man from von Gersdorff's 1519 treatise is used as the weapon list for the tabletop roleplaying game "Mörk Borg".

Further reading

 Jack Hartnell, "Wording the Wound Man", British Art Studies (6), 2017: http://britishartstudies.ac.uk/issues/issue-index/issue-6/wound-man
 Cahill, Patricia A. Wound-man Walking: Visceral History and Traumatized Bodies in A Larum for London Unto the Breach: Martial Formations, Historical Trauma, and the Early Modern Stage

References

History of medicine